Heinz Wimmersal Sachsenberg (12 July 1922 – 17 June 1951) was a German World War II fighter ace who served in the Luftwaffe. He was also a recipient of the Knight's Cross of the Iron Cross, the highest award in the military and paramilitary forces of Nazi Germany during World War II. Sachsenberg claimed 104 aerial victories.

Early life
Sachsenberg was born on 12 July 1922 in Dessau. "Heino", also called "Wimmersaal" by his comrades, was the nephew of Gotthard Sachsenberg, a World War I fighter pilot and recipient of the Pour le Mérite. He had a brother also named Gotthard, who also served in the Luftwaffe, and was killed in action on 8 March 1944 during a night fighter mission.

Flying on the Eastern Front
After flight training he was assigned, as a Feldwebel, to Jagdgeschwader 52 (JG 52—52nd Fighter Wing) in the Fall of 1942. He was sent to the Eastern Front in late 1942 and was assigned to 6. Staffel (6th squadron) of JG 52. At the time, 6. Staffel was commanded by Oberleutnant Rudolf Resch and was subordinated to II. Gruppe (2nd group) of JG 52 und the leadership of Hauptmann Johannes Steinhoff.

By the end of July 1943, he had shot down 22 enemy airplanes in heavy air combat over the Kuban bridgehead. His unit was then transferred to cover the retreat from the southern Kursk salient where he scored a further 16 victories. After a spell of leave from September to November due to overstress (when he was also awarded the German Cross in Gold and Honor Goblet of the Luftwaffe, he returned to the Crimea and the intense air-battles over the Kerch Straits.

After 76 victories, and on leave, Sachsenberg was recommended for the Knight's Cross of the Iron Cross in March 1944. Upon returning to the Crimea at the beginning of May, he shot down 25 aircraft in just a month including six aircraft on 7 May, making him an "ace-in-a-day" for the first time. On 31 May, over Iași, in the battles for Romania, he claimed four victories (89-92v.) and five more were claimed on 8 June 1944, bringing his total to 101 air victories. He was the 76th Luftwaffe pilot to achieve the century mark. Fahnenjunker-Feldwebel Sachsenberg was awarded the Knight's Cross on 9 June 1944. Returning from leave, his unit was then transferred to cover the Ploiești oilfields in Romania. On 23 August 1944, he was seriously wounded during an air battle with United States Army Air Forces (USAAF) North American P-51 Mustang fighters, resulting in a forced landing of his Bf 109 G-6, (Werknummer 166233) "Yellow 1". Promoted to Leutnant, he claimed his final victories over Hungary, including a USAAF P-51 and a Soviet Bell P-39 Airacobra.

The Sachsenberg Schwarm

In 1945, he transferred briefly to jet fighters in Jagdgeschwader 7 (JG 7—7th Fighter Wing) as Staffelkapitän (squadron leader) of 9. Staffel of JG 7, but in April 1945 he joined Jagdverband 44 (JV 44—44th Fighter Detachment) based at Munich-Riem. His task was to provide top cover for the Messerschmitt Me 262 jet fighters during takeoff and landing. Sachsenberg was assigned as Staffelkapitän of the Platzschutzstaffel or airfield-protection squadron, flying the Focke-Wulf Fw 190 D-9 fighter. As squadron commander, his particular aircraft was known as "Red 1".  The inscription on his Fw 190 D-9 was "Verkaaft's mei Gwand I foahr in Himmel!" meaning "Sell my clothes I'm going to heaven". The Me 262 jet was vulnerable to strafing attacks during takeoff and landing. Generalleutnant Adolf Galland, the commanding officer of JV 44, ordered the formation of the Platzschutzstaffel. Already in 1944, III. Gruppe of Jagdgeschwader 54 (JG 54—54th Fighter Wing), flying the Fw 190 D, had provided fighter protection to Kommando Nowotny, the first experimental Me 262 jet fighter unit.

The aircraft in the protection squadron were painted red on their underbelly with prominent white stripes to help in their identification by ground crews. The legend of the Papagei Staffel (parrot squadron) was born (the name was given after the war and is truly misleading as it was not used by the squadron itself). The decision to paint the aircraft in this manner was made by the pilots themselves, perhaps as result of the failed Operation Bodenplatte, where a number of German aircraft were lost to friendly fire.

The protection squadron was tasked with flying Start- und Landeschutz (Takeoff and landing cover). During takeoff and landing, the jets were very vulnerable to attacks by strafing Allied ground-attack airplanes, because their engines were not very responsive at those times and the jets could not accelerate and decelerate quickly. Thus to give additional protection besides the light and medium AA-guns around the airfields, parts of JG 52 and JG 54 were delegated to fly protective missions to cover the takeoff-and-landing phase of the 'Stormbirds'. JV 44 was a special case in that they had their own protection squadron.

After the war
He died on 17 June 1951 in Lich, following complications from wounds he received on 23 October 1944.

Quotations
"I don't trust anything without a Propeller at least." - Sachsenberg in reply to being asked why he didn't fly jet aircraft.

Summary of career

Aerial victory claims
According to US historian David T. Zabecki, Sachsenberg was credited with 104 aerial victories. Obermaier also lists Sachsenberg with 104 aerial victories, claimed in 520 combat missions, one on the Western Front and 103 on the Eastern Front. He was also credited with the destruction of one fast attack craft. Mathews and Foreman, authors of Luftwaffe Aces — Biographies and Victory Claims, researched the German Federal Archives and found records for 104 aerial victory claims, 103 aerial victories on the Eastern Front and one on the Western Front.

Victory claims were logged to a map-reference (PQ = Planquadrat), for example "PQ 34 Ost 7545". These sectors were then subdivided into 36 smaller units to give a location area 3 × 4 km in size.

Awards
Iron Cross (1939) 2nd and 1st Class
Honour Goblet of the Luftwaffe on 11 October 1943 as Feldwebel and pilot
German Cross in Gold on 17 October 1943 as Feldwebel in the 6./Jagdgeschwader 52
Knight's Cross of the Iron Cross on 9 June 1944 as Fahnenjunker-Feldwebel and pilot in the 6./Jagdgeschwader 52

Notes

References

Citations

Bibliography

 
 
 
 
 
 
 
 
 
 
 
 
 
 

1922 births
1951 deaths
Luftwaffe pilots
German World War II flying aces
People from Dessau-Roßlau
Recipients of the Gold German Cross
Recipients of the Knight's Cross of the Iron Cross
Military personnel from Saxony-Anhalt